The following is a list of Australian radio station callsigns beginning with the number 2, indicating a radio station in the state of New South Wales.

Defunct Callsigns

References

 
Radio
Lists of radio stations in Australia